was a Japanese baseball player and former manager of the Nankai Hawks.

Anabuki died July 31, 2018.

References

1933 births
2018 deaths
Baseball people from Kagawa Prefecture
Chuo University alumni
Japanese baseball players
Nankai Hawks players
Managers of baseball teams in Japan
Fukuoka SoftBank Hawks managers